The Nier Prize is named after Alfred O. C. Nier. It is awarded annually by the Meteoritical Society and recognizes outstanding research in meteoritics and closely allied fields by young scientists.
Recipients must be under 35 years old at the end of the calendar year in which they are selected. The Leonard Medal Committee recommends to the Council candidates for the Nier Prize.

Nier Prize Winners

See also

 List of astronomy awards
 Glossary of meteoritics

References

 

Astronomy prizes
Meteorite prizes
American awards
Awards established in 1996